PTN in Indonesia (abbreviated PIFPK) is a state college located at Jalan Wanamarta Raya No. 20, Industrial Estate, Kendal Regency, Central Java 51351, Kendal Regency.

PIFPK profile 

Kendal Wood Furniture and Processing Industry Polytechnic (Kendal Furniture Polytechnic) is a State Vocational Higher Education under the Ministry of Industry aimed at meeting the needs of competent furniture experts for the furniture industry.

Departments and study programs 

 Furniture Design Study Program
 Furniture Industry Business Management Study Program
 Furniture Production Engineering Study Program

Penulis 
Wira Sapta Dwi Saputra

External links 

Official website 

Universities in Central Java
2017 establishments in Indonesia
Educational institutions established in 2017